Gmina Tuczna is a rural gmina (administrative district) in Biała Podlaska County, Lublin Voivodeship, in eastern Poland.

Villages
Gmina Tuczna contains the villages and settlements of Bokinka Królewska, Bokinka Pańska, Choroszczynka, Dąbrowica Duża, Kalichowszczyzna, Leniuszki, Matiaszówka, Mazanówka, Międzyleś, Ogrodniki, Rozbitówka, Tuczna, Wiski, Władysławów, Wólka Zabłocka, Wólka Zabłocka-Kolonia and Żuki.

Neighbouring gminas
Gmina Tuczna is bordered by the gminas of Hanna, Kodeń, Łomazy, Piszczac, Sławatycze and Sosnówka.

References

External links
Polish official population figures 2006

Gminas in Lublin Voivodeship
Biała Podlaska County